Roland Sallai (born 22 May 1997) is a Hungarian professional footballer who plays as a winger for Bundesliga club SC Freiburg and the Hungary national team.

Club career

Puskás Akadémia
Sallai started his professional career at Puskás Akadémia where he played from 2014 until the summer of 2017. He made his debut on 1 August 2014 against Pécs, and scored first goal in Hungarian league against Ferencváros on 14 September 2014 in Groupama Aréna.

Palermo (loan)
On 4 August 2016, Sallai joined Italian club Palermo on a seasonal loan, until the end of the 2016–17 season with a loan fee of €300,000.

Sallai completed 84 minutes on his debut for Serie A's club on 10 September 2016 against Napoli. He scored his first official goal for Palermo on 19 March 2017 against Udinese. He appeared in 21 Serie A matches (eleven in the starting line-up, ten as a substitute) and scored one goal.

APOEL
On 29 August 2017, it was announced that APOEL had secured his signature on a four year contract until the end of May 2021, for an undisclosed transfer fee from Puskás, rumored to be around €2 million.

On 9 September, he made his debut and scored his first goal against Nea Salamina. He appeared in 29 Cypriot First Division matches and scored 9 goals.

He also appeared in six UEFA Champions League matches against Real Madrid, Borussia Dortmund and Tottenham Hotspur.

SC Freiburg
On 31 August 2018, Sallai signed a four-year deal with Bundesliga club, SC Freiburg for a fee reported to be €4.5 million. On 22 September 2018 he scored and won a penalty on his debut against Wolfsburg at Volkswagen Arena on the 4th match day of the 2018–19 Bundesliga in a 3–1 victory, and he was named in the team of the week following his performance. From middle of November 2018 he had an adductor problems, and was unable to play for the next five months. He returned as a substitute on 5 May 2019 against Fortuna Düsseldorf.

Sallai started his third season at the Freiburg with a goal and a assist against VfB Stuttgart in a 3–2 victory. He scored two goals against Schalke 04 in 2–0 victory in Veltins-Arena and was named in the team of the 12th match day by sports magazine kicker.

On 16 April 2022, he scored twice against VfL Bochum at the Europa-Park Stadion on the 30th game week in the 2021–22 Bundesliga season. Both assist were prepared by Jeong Woo-yeong. He was also voted for the best player of Game Week 30 by Kicker.

International career
Sallai was part of the Hungarian U-20 team at the 2015 FIFA U-20 World Cup, playing in two games. He made his debut for U-21 team against Italy U21 on 12 August 2015.

He made his full international debut on 20 May 2016 in a friendly match against Ivory Coast at the Groupama Arena, Budapest, Hungary. On 5 May 2016, Sallai was named in Hungary's preliminary Euro 2016 squad, but was left off of final squad for the tournament. On 11 September 2018, he scored his first goal for the national team against Greece at the Groupama Arena, Budapest, in a 2018–19 UEFA Nations League C match.

On 1 June 2021, Sallai was included in the final 26-man squad to represent Hungary at the rescheduled UEFA Euro 2020 tournament. On 14 June 2022, he scored a brace in a 4–0 away win over England in the 2022–23 UEFA Nations League A, to be England's worst home defeat since the Wembley Wizards match in 1928.

He scored the first goal in a 2–1 victory against Greece on 20 November 2022. The match was also the farewell of Balázs Dzsudzsák.

Personal life
Sallai's uncle is former Hungarian national team defender Sándor Sallai.

Career statistics

Club

International
.

Scores and results list Hungary's goal tally first, score column indicates score after each Sallai goal.

Honours
2021–22 Bundesliga: player of week 30

References

External links

 
 MLSZ 
 Roland Sallai profile at magyarfutball.hu 
 

1997 births
Living people
Footballers from Budapest
Hungarian footballers
Hungary youth international footballers
Hungary under-21 international footballers
Hungary international footballers
Association football forwards
Puskás Akadémia FC players
Palermo F.C. players
APOEL FC players
SC Freiburg players
Nemzeti Bajnokság I players
Serie A players
Cypriot First Division players
Bundesliga players
UEFA Euro 2020 players
Hungarian expatriate footballers
Hungarian expatriate sportspeople in Italy
Expatriate footballers in Italy
Hungarian expatriate sportspeople in Cyprus
Expatriate footballers in Cyprus
Hungarian expatriate sportspeople in Germany
Expatriate footballers in Germany